Glenn Carroll (born 15 June 1967) is an Australian bobsledder. He competed in the two man and the four man events at the 1994 Winter Olympics.

References

External links
 

1967 births
Living people
Australian male bobsledders
Olympic bobsledders of Australia
Bobsledders at the 1994 Winter Olympics
Sportspeople from Newcastle, New South Wales